Jabal al-Arba'in (also spelled known as Jabal Maarin) is a mountain near Maarin al-Jabal in the Hama Governorate in Syria. It has an elevation of 683 meters, it ranks as the 27th highest mountain in Hama and the 507th highest in Syria.

See also 

 List of mountains in Syria

References

Mountains of Hama Governorate